Hinrich Romeike (born 26 May 1963 in Hamburg) is a German eventing rider. With his horse Marius he won gold medals in individual eventing and team eventing together with Ingrid Klimke, Andreas Dibowski, Peter Thomsen and Frank Ostholt at the 2008 Summer Olympics.

Biography
He already won with the team at the 2006 FEI World Equestrian Games in Aachen, Germany. At the 2004 Summer Olympics he made the 4th place in team eventing and the 5th place in individual eventing.

He came out in first place after a stellar performance in the Cross-Country phase, and maintained his position with fast, clear jumping rounds, and took home the Olympic gold medal in both Team and Individual Eventing for Germany.

Alongside eventing and winning two Olympic gold medals, Hinrich is working as a dentist full-time in Rendsburg. He lives with his wife and three children in Nübbel, Schleswig-Holstein, Germany. Hinrich being tracked by the BBC as part of their series World Olympic Dreams, which follows him in the run-up to London 2012.

References

External links 
 Portrait German Equestrian Federation in German
 Portrait NDR Online in German
 Romeike seeks crowning glory in London

German dentists
German event riders
Olympic gold medalists for Germany
Equestrians at the 2004 Summer Olympics
Equestrians at the 2008 Summer Olympics
Olympic equestrians of Germany
German male equestrians
Sportspeople from Hamburg
1963 births
Living people
Olympic medalists in equestrian
Medalists at the 2008 Summer Olympics